Karkhaneh-ye Qand-e Shirvan (also Romanized as Kārkhāneh-ye Qand-e Shīrvān) is a village in Ziarat Rural District, in the Central District of Shirvan County, North Khorasan Province, Iran. At the 2006 census, its population was 406, in 89 families. This factory was started to be built in the years before the Islamic revolution and after it was built, it had a production capacity of one thousand tons. It has continued to produce sugar in the 40s with an increased capacity of four thousand tons per day. Most of the parts of this factory were before  The Islamic revolution is from Germany and Poland. After the revolution, the Shirvan sugar factory continued its production and daily delivery of 3,500 tons of beet sugar in the fall and a little in the spring, and the refining of cane sugar in the year provided a little of Iran's sugar.  he does.

See also 

 Ban Shirvan
 Bi Bi Shirvan
 Now Shirvan Kola
 Shirvan County
 Shirvan, Iran
 Shirvan, Lorestan
 Shirvan Mahalleh
 Shirvan Rural District
 Shirvan District
 Shirvan Shahlu

References 

Populated places in Shirvan County